The Cessna 180 Skywagon is a four- or six-seat, fixed conventional gear general aviation airplane which was produced between 1953 and 1981. Though the design is no longer in production, many of these aircraft are still in use as personal aircraft and in utility roles such as bush flying.

Development

Cessna introduced the heavier and more powerful 180 as a complement to the Cessna 170. It eventually came to be known as the Skywagon.

The prototype Cessna 180, N41697, first flew on May 26, 1952. Cessna engineering test pilot William D. Thompson was at the controls.

In all its versions, 6,193 Cessna 180s were manufactured. In 1956, a tricycle gear version of this design was introduced as the Cessna 182, which came to bear the name Skylane. Additionally, in 1960, Cessna introduced a heavier, more powerful sibling to the 180, the conventional gear Cessna 185. For a time, all three versions of the design were in production.

Design

The airframe of the 180 is all-metal, constructed of aluminum alloy. The fuselage is a semi-monocoque structure, with exterior skin sheets riveted to formers and longerons. The strut-braced wings, likewise, are constructed of exterior skin sheets riveted to spars and ribs. The landing gear of the 180 is in a conventional arrangement, with main gear legs made of spring steel, and a steerable tailwheel mounted on a hollow tapered steel tube.

Cessna 180s produced between 1953 and 1963 have two side windows, while 1964 to 1981 models feature three side windows, as they use the same fuselage as the Cessna 185. 180s can be equipped with floats and skis.

Operational history

Record flight

The Cessna 180 gained recognition as the aircraft chosen by Geraldine Mock, the first woman pilot to successfully fly around the world. The flight was made in 1964 in her 1953 model, the Spirit of Columbus (N1538C), as chronicled in her book Three-Eight Charlie.  The Cessna factory obtained the aircraft and kept it at the Pawnee (Wichita, Kansas) manufacturing plant after the epic flight, suspended from the ceiling over one of the manufacturing lines. It is currently on display at the National Air and Space Museum.

Variants
180
Four seat high wing light aircraft powered by a  Continental O-470-A, O-470-J, or a  O-470-K engine, landplane gross weight  and first certified on 23 December 1952.

180A
Four seat high wing light aircraft powered by a  Continental O-470-K, landplane gross weight  and first certified on 17 December 1956.

Four seat high wing light aircraft powered by a  Continental O-470-K, landplane gross weight  and first certified on 22 August 1958.

Four seat high wing light aircraft powered by a  Continental O-470-L or O-470-R, landplane gross weight  and first certified on 8 July 1959.

180D
Four seat high wing light aircraft powered by a  Continental O-470-L or O-470-R, landplane gross weight  and first certified on 14 June 1960.
180E
Four seat high wing light aircraft powered by a  Continental O-470-L or O-470-R, landplane gross weight  and first certified on 21 September 1961.
180F
Four seat high wing light aircraft powered by a  Continental O-470-L or O-470-R, landplane gross weight  and first certified on 25 June 1962.

180G
Six seat high wing light aircraft powered by a  Continental O-470-L or O-470-R, landplane gross weight  and first certified on 19 July 1963.
180H
Six seat high wing light aircraft powered by a  Continental O-470-L or O-470-R, landplane gross weight  and first certified on 17 June 1964.
180I
 There was no "I" model Cessna 180.

Six seat high wing light aircraft powered by a  Continental O-470-R or O-470-S, landplane gross weight  and first certified on 13 October 1972.

Six seat high wing light aircraft powered by a  Continental O-470-U for which AVGAS 100 or 100LL is specified; previous engines were designed for AVGAS 80 (formerly called 80/87), landplane gross weight  and first certified on 19 August 1976.

Operators

Civil
The Cessna 180  is popular with air charter companies and is operated by private individuals and companies.

Military

19 Cessna 180s were in service with both the Australian Army and RAAF from 1959 to 1974.
Royal Australian Air Force
No. 16 Air Observation Post Flight RAAF
Australian Army Aviation
No. 16 Army Light Aircraft Flight
161 (Independent) Reconnaissance Flight – The Australian Army operated a number of Cessna 180s as surveillance aircraft with the 161 Reconnaissance Flight (call sign "Possum") during the Vietnam War.

Union of Burma Air Force - 10 Cessna 180s operated in 1982.

Public Force of Costa Rica

Honduran Air Force

Indonesian Air Force

Israeli Air Force

Khmer Air Force – operated 2 Cessna 180s.

Philippine Air Force

Specifications (1978 Cessna 180 II landplane)

See also

References

Bibliography

External links

 National Air and Space Museum exhibit of Jerry Mock's Cessna 180, "Spirit of Columbus"
 FAA N1538C "Spirit of Columbus" Returns to Public Display at the NASM's Steven Udvar-Hazy Center

180
1950s United States civil utility aircraft
Single-engined tractor aircraft
High-wing aircraft
Aircraft first flown in 1952
Glider tugs